William Prince Ford (January 15, 1803 – August 23, 1866) was an American Baptist minister, preacher and planter in pre-Civil War Louisiana. He was the slave owner who first bought Solomon Northup, a free African-American, after Northup had been kidnapped in Washington, D.C., and sold in New Orleans in 1841. He resided in the "Great Pine Woods", Avoyelles, Red River Parish, Louisiana, and he ran a farm there. At the same year, Ezra Bennett, a Bayou Boeuf storekeeper and planter, lived near the plantation of Prince Ford and gave him instructions to his factors.

After selling Northup to another slaveholder, Ford in 1843 converted, with most of his Baptist congregation, to the Churches of Christ, to which Ford had become influenced by the writings of Alexander Campbell. Campbell visited the congregation in 1857, at which time Campbell was favorably impressed by the fellowship practiced between blacks and whites in the congregation. As of 2014, the congregation continues as the Cheneyville Christian Church. It is the oldest congregation associated with the Restoration Movement in Louisiana.

Biography 
Willlam Prince Ford was born in 1803. He was a pioneer planter of the Cheneyville area, and was among the first recipients of a land patent from the United States in southwestern Louisiana. He was also a dedicated Baptist minister associated with the Beulah Baptist Church in Cheneyville and the Springhill Baptist Church.

His letters reflect a particularly God-fearing, righteous man who was quite articulate.

Ford was a principal in a doctrinal quarrel over predestination that raged among Cheneyville Baptists in 1840s. He was finally expelled from Springhill Baptist Church as a heretic for, among other reasons, allowing a Methodist to take communion in the church.

In 1841, William Prince Ford purchased Solomon Northup at an auction in New Orleans, Louisiana. In Saratoga Springs Solomon Northup worked as a plumber, so he began to help William Prince Ford with the lumber mill. He showed him how to build rafts from pine trees they cut and how to tie the pines together to float on the water. Solomon Northup wanted to build a mill on the banks of Indian Creek, so William Prince Ford helped him. Despite this, the farm still lost money, he accumulated more debt and finally sold Northup.

Popular culture 
In the 2013 feature film 12 Years a Slave, Ford was portrayed by Benedict Cumberbatch. Some of Ford's descendants have objected to the portrayal in the film as rendering Ford as a "pompous hypocrite; a weak-willed man unable to protect Northup and his fellow slaves from sadistic overseers in the cotton fields," in contrast to Northup's own description of Ford as a humane man: "There never was a more kind, noble, candid Christian man than William Ford."

References

Bibliography 

 
 

1803 births
1866 deaths
American Disciples of Christ
American planters
American slave owners
Farmers from Louisiana
American members of the Churches of Christ
Baptists from Louisiana
Businesspeople from Louisiana
History of slavery in Louisiana
Ministers of the Churches of Christ
Restoration Movement
Christianity and slavery
19th-century American people
Baptist ministers from the United States
19th-century American clergy